Vincent Mario Russo  (25 August 1930 – 10 August 2021) was a lieutenant general in the United States Army. His assignments included Director of the Defense Logistics Agency and Assistant Deputy Chief of Staff for Logistics. He was an alumnus of Fordham University.

References

1930 births
2021 deaths
American people of Italian descent
United States Army generals
Fordham University alumni
People from New York City